Belica may refer to:

 Belica, Međimurje County, Croatia
 Belica, Dobrova–Polhov Gradec in Slovenia
 Belica, Osilnica in Slovenia
 Belica (river), in Serbia
 Belica (Jagodina), village in Serbia
 Belica (Makedonski Brod), a village in the Republic of North Macedonia
 Belica, Kičevo, a village in the Republic of North Macedonia
 Belica, town in Second Polish Republic prior to Soviet invasion of Poland; now Belitsa, Belarus
 Belica, a small fish, the Moderlieschen (Leucaspius delineatus)

See also
Belitsa (disambiguation)